The Thomas Farm site is an Early Miocene, Hemingfordian assemblage of vertebrate fossils located in Gilchrist County, northern Florida.

The Thomas Farm site is one of the richest terrestrial deposits of Miocene vertebrates in the 18 Ma range found in eastern North America according to the Florida Museum of Natural History. The site was discovered in 1931 by Florida Geological Survey (FGS) staff member Clarence Simpson. Specimens include: amphibians, reptiles, birds, small rodents, bats, rhinoceroses, three species of three-toed horses, several artiodactyls (including camels, peccary, deer-like species and other extinct forms), as well as dogs, bears, and bear-dogs.

Specimens

Reptilia
Pseudemys sp.
Testudo (T. tedwhitei)
Promilio (P. epileus)
Promilio (P. brodkorbi)
Proictinia (P. floridana)
Alligator (A. olseni)
Paraoxybelis (P. floridanus)
Pseudocemophora (P. antiqua)
Anilioides (A. minuatus)
Pseudoepicrates (P. stanolseni)
Ogmophis (O. pauperrimus
Calamagras (C. floridanus)

Birds

Phalacrocoracidae 

 Phalacrocorax (P. subvolans)

Columbidae
Arenicolumba prattae

Mammals

Rhinocerotidae
Diceratherium (D. barbouri)
Floridaceras (F. whitei)

Equidae 
Parahippus (P. leonensis)
Anchitherium (A. clarencei)

Amphicyonidae
Daphoenus (D. caroniavorus
Amphicyon (A. longiramus)
Cynelos (C. caroniavorus)

Ursidae
Aelurodon (A. johnhenryi)
Phoberocyon (johnhenryi)

Mustelidae
Mephitaxus (M. ancipidens)
Miomustela
Zodiolestes (Z. freundi)
Oligobunis (O. floridanus)

Canidae
Osbornodon iamonensis
Euoplocyon (E. spissidens)
Metatomarctus (M. canavus)
Aelurocyon (A. spissidens)
Phlaocyon sp.

Chiroptera
Chiroptera sp.
Primonatalus (P. prattae)
Karstala (K. silva)
Miomyotis (M. floridanus)
Svaptenos (S. whitei)

Artiodactyla
Floridachoerus (F. olseni)
Machaeromeryx (M. gilchristensis)
Parablastomeryx (P. floridanus)
Merycoidodon sp.
Syndyoceras (S. australis)
Floridatragulus (F. dolichanthereus)
Oxydactylus (O. floridanus)
Nothokemas (N. floridanus)

Soricidae
Limnoecus sp.

Rodentia
Cricetidae
Proheteromys (P. magnus)
Proheteromys P. floridanus)
Miospermophilus
Nototamias (N. hulberti)
Petauristodon (P. pattersoni)
Mesogaulus
Mylagaulidae

Amphibians
Proacris (P. mintoni)
Proacris mintoni

References

Paleobiology Database: Thomas Farm collection

Paleontological sites of Florida
Geography of Gilchrist County, Florida
Neogene Florida
Miocene United States
Miocene paleontological sites of North America
1931 in paleontology